Eurosport News was the first 24-hour international Europe-based sports news channel part of the European sports network Eurosport, owned by Discovery Inc. It was available at 11 million homes for 54 countries worldwide.

History
The channel launched on 1 September 2000 and quietly closed down on 1 January 2018. It featured live scores, highlights, most recent breaking news and commentaries with recorded voiceovers, similar to Euronews. Eurosport News' sportscasts were broadcast around the clock in 15-minute blocks with frequent updates. The service combined video, text and graphics with the screen being divided into 4 sections. A video section that displayed highlights and news bulletins, a breaking news ticker at the bottom and a scoring section that gave in-depth analysis of results and game stats.

References

External links
 

News
Sports television channels in the United Kingdom
Sports mass media in Italy
Television channels in Italy
Television stations in Portugal
Television channels and stations established in 2000
Television channels and stations disestablished in 2018